Dunstable Downs Golf Club is a golf club in the southwest of Dunstable, Bedfordshire, England. It was established in 1906. As of 1995 the course measured 6251 yards. The club has hosted the British PGA Matchplay Championship.

References

External links
Official site

Golf clubs and courses in Bedfordshire
1906 establishments in England